1st Earl of Suffolk may refer to:

Ralph the Staller, 1st Earl of Norfolk and Suffolk (c. 1011–1068)
Robert d'Ufford, 1st Earl of Suffolk (1298 – 1369)
Michael de la Pole, 1st Earl of Suffolk (c. 1330 – 1389)
Thomas Howard, 1st Earl of Suffolk (1561 – 1626)

See also
Earl of Suffolk